Scranton is a city in Osage County, Kansas, United States.  As of the 2020 census, the population of the city was 653.  It was named after the city of Scranton, Pennsylvania due to its coal mining in the 19th century.

History
Scranton was founded in 1871 as a coal town. It was named after Scranton, Pennsylvania.

The first post office in Scranton was established in September 1872.

As of 1890, Scranton was reported to be one of many Kansas coal mining towns that were sundown towns, meaning that African Americans were not allowed to live there.

Geography
Scranton is located at  (38.779307, -95.737918).

Climate
The climate in this area is characterized by hot, humid summers and generally mild to cool winters.  According to the Köppen Climate Classification system, Scranton has a humid subtropical climate, abbreviated "Cfa" on climate maps.

Demographics

Scranton is part of the Topeka, Kansas Metropolitan Statistical Area.

2010 census
As of the census of 2010, there were 710 people, 265 households, and 189 families residing in the city. The racial makeup of the city was 97.6% White, 0.4% Native American, 0.6% Asian, 0.8% from other races, and 0.6% from two or more races. Hispanic or Latino of any race were 2.4% of the population.

There were 265 households, of which 37.0% had children under the age of 18 living with them, 54.7% were married couples living together, 10.6% had a female householder with no husband present, 6.0% had a male householder with no wife present, and 28.7% were non-families. 24.2% of all households were made up of individuals, and 11.3% had someone living alone who was 65 years of age or older. The average household size was 2.68 and the average family size was 3.19.

The median age in the city was 36.8 years. 30.3% of residents were under the age of 18; 7.7% were between the ages of 18 and 24; 23.2% were from 25 to 44; 24.2% were from 45 to 64; and 14.5% were 65 years of age or older. The gender makeup of the city was 48.7% male and 51.3% female.

2000 census
As of the census of 2000, there were 724 people, 263 households, and 181 families residing in the city. The racial makeup of the city was 95.44% White, 0.83% African American, 0.69% Native American, 0.14% Asian, and 2.90% from two or more races. Hispanic or Latino of any race were 1.52% of the population.

There were 263 households, out of which 35.7% had children under the age of 18 living with them, 53.2% were married couples living together, 10.3% had a female householder with no husband present, and 30.8% were non-families. 25.1% of all households were made up of individuals, and 12.9% had someone living alone who was 65 years of age or older. The average household size was 2.75 and the average family size was 3.34.

In the city, the population was spread out, with 31.9% under the age of 18, 7.3% from 18 to 24, 29.7% from 25 to 44, 19.5% from 45 to 64, and 11.6% who were 65 years of age or older. The median age was 33 years. For every 100 females, there were 90.0 males. For every 100 females age 18 and over, there were 94.1 males.

The median income for a household in the city was $37,794, and the median income for a family was $40,521. Males had a median income of $31,364 versus $22,083 for females. The per capita income for the city was $15,210. About 8.3% of families and 11.9% of the population were below the poverty line, including 18.6% of those under age 18 and 6.8% of those age 65 or over.

Education
Scranton is served by USD 434 Santa Fe Trail. USD 434 includes Carbondale, Overbrook and Scranton. The district high school is Santa Fe Trail High School.

The Santa Fe Trail Chargers won the Kansas State High School boys class 4A basketball championship in 1997 and the girls class 4A basketball championship in 1998.

See also
 Santa Fe Trail

References

Further reading

External links

 City of Scranton
 Scranton - Directory of Public Officials
 USD 434, local school district
 Scranton city map, KDOT

Cities in Osage County, Kansas
Cities in Kansas
Topeka metropolitan area, Kansas
Sundown towns in Kansas